Fabrice Labrousse (21 September 1806 – 22 August 1876 ) was a 19th-century French playwright. He was the grandfather of the dramatist Fabrice Carré (1855-1921).

Works

Theatre 
 1838: Le Chevalier du Temple, drama in five acts by F. Labrousse and Albert, Théâtre de l'Ambigu-Comique (14 April)
 1839: La Nuit du meurtre, drama in five acts by F. Labrousse and Albert, Ambigu-Comique (3 August) 
 1839: Le Lion du desert, melodrama in three acts by Ferdinand Laloue and Fabrice Labrousse, Cirque-Olympique (27 November)
 1842: Le Prince Eugène et l'Impératrice Joséphine, drama in three acts by Ferdinand Laloue and Fabrice Labrousse, Cirque-Olympique (17 December)

Librettos 
Le 15 Août, cantata, music by Alfred Brillant, Théâtre du Prince Impérial.

Essais 
Lettre politique ou Courte réponse à de nombreuses accusations, Paris, Guillaumin, 1833.
Fabrice Labrousse, J. Marty et B. Blaisot (dir.), Annales du théâtre, ou Galerie historique des principaux auteurs et acteurs, par une société de gens de lettres et d'artistes, Paris, Blaisot, 1833.

References

External links 
Entry on 

19th-century French dramatists and playwrights
1806 births
People from Cahors
1876 deaths